Michael Marcuzzi is a visual effects artist.

He won a 2017 Annie Award in Outstanding Achievement, Animated Effects in a Live Action Production for his work on Doctor Strange. Marcuzzi won the award along with Georg Kaltenbrunner, Thomas Bevan, Andrew Graham and Jihyun Yoon.

Selected filmography
 Doctor Strange (2016)

References

External links

Living people
Annie Award winners
Year of birth missing (living people)